The Book Girl Japanese original video animation (OVA) episodes are based on a collection of Japanese light novels of the same name written by Mizuki Nomura, with illustrations by Miho Takeoka. They are directed by Shunsuke Tada and produced by the animation studio Production I.G. Composed by Masumi Itō, the music is produced by Lantis with Toshihiko Nakajima as the sound director. Chief animator Keita Matsumoto is also the character designer, and the screenplay was written by Yuka Yamada and Megumi Sasano. The story centers around Konoha Inoue, a writer in high school who joined the literature club after meeting Tohko Amano, the president and sole member of the club. Tohko can only eat stories by consuming the paper they are printed on and Tohko often asks Konoha to write her short stories as "snacks".

A stand-alone episode titled Book Girl Today's Snack: First Love was bundled with a limited edition version of the second side story novel volume Book Girl: Apprentice's Heartbreak sold on December 26, 2009. A series of three OVAs under the collective title Book Girl Memoir covers stories primarily about three of the main characters: Tohko Amano for volume one, Miu Asakura for volume two, and Nanase Kotobuki for volume three. Tohko's episode, titled Prelude to the Dream Girl, was released on DVD on June 25, 2010. Miu's episode, titled Requiem of the Sky Dancing Angel, was sold on DVD on October 29, 2010. Nanase's episode, titled Rhapsody of the Maiden in Love, was released on DVD December 24, 2010.

The Book Girl Memoir OVAs have four pieces of theme music: one opening theme and three ending themes.

Episode list

Book Girl Today's Snack: First Love

Book Girl Memoir

References

External links
Official website 

Book Girl